In enzymology, a N-malonylurea hydrolase is an enzyme that catalyzes the chemical reaction

3-oxo-3-ureidopropanoate + H2O  malonate + urea

Thus, the two substrates of this enzyme are 3-oxo-3-ureidopropanoate and H2O, whereas its two products are malonate and urea.

This enzyme belongs to the family of hydrolases, those acting on carbon-nitrogen bonds other than peptide bonds, specifically in linear amides.  The systematic name of this enzyme class is 3-oxo-3-ureidopropanoate amidohydrolase (urea- and malonate-forming). This enzyme is also called ureidomalonase.

References

 
 

EC 3.5.1
Enzymes of unknown structure